Constance is an unincorporated community in Cedar County, Nebraska, United States.

History
A post office was established at Constance in 1888, and remained in operation until it was discontinued in 1909.

References

Unincorporated communities in Cedar County, Nebraska
Unincorporated communities in Nebraska